Caritas Bianchi College of Careers (CBCC) was established in 1971 and has been providing post-secondary education since then. At present, it mainly offers sub-degree programmes in three general disciplines: business and hospitality management, design and health sciences. It is located at Tiu Keng Leng, Tseung Kwan O, near Tiu Keng Leng station.

Timeline
Caritas Bianchi College of Careers, (formerly known as Bishop Bianchi College of Careers) was founded in 1971 by Caritas Hong Kong. In its initial operation, the college offered a variety of programmes in Accounting, Design, Tourism and Hotel Business at certificate and diploma levels.
In 1997, became the first institution in Hong Kong and to be granted the approval from the Business & Technology Education Council (BTEC) to offer the two-year BTEC Higher National Diploma (HND) and its foundation programmes.
In 2001, offered the recognized dual-award Associate Degree programmes in Business and Hospitality Management as accredited by the then Hong Kong Council for Academic Accreditation. In the same year, the College became the first non-University Grants Committee (UGC) funded institution to be registered as an official BTEC registered centre offering a series of BTEC programmes.
In 2002, offered the accredited associate degree in Design programme. In June of that year, Caritas was given a $15 million "start-up loan" by the Government of Hong Kong to set up a temporary campus for Bianchi College.
In 2004, offered the one-year top-up Bachelor of Business Administration in Management Programme in collaboration with the Open University of Hong Kong.
In 2005, offered the one-year top-up Bachelor of Hospitality and Tourism Management Programme in collaboration with the Open University of Hong Kong.
In 2006, became the first non-UGC funded institution to be granted a piece of land in Tseung Kwan O for the construction of a permanent campus by the government.
In 2007, offered the one-year top-up bachelor's degree Programmes in the disciplines of Hospitality Management, Fashion Design, Graphic Design and Interior Design in collaboration with the University of Huddersfield.
In 2008, merged with the Caritas Francis Hsu College administratively to pave the way for the establishment of a catholic university in Hong Kong.
In 2009, the 10-storey new campus in Tseung Kwan O with a floor area of 16,730 sq. m. was in operation.
In 2010, establish Department of Health Science and planned to offer the Higher Diploma in Pharmaceutical Dispensing Programme.
In 2012, offered the 2-year Higher Diploma in Pharmaceutical Dispensing Programme.

See also
List of higher education institutions in Hong Kong
Caritas Hong Kong

References

External links
Official website

Catholic universities and colleges in Hong Kong
Tiu Keng Leng
Educational institutions established in 1971
Universities and colleges in Hong Kong
Catholic Church in Hong Kong
Caritas Hong Kong
1971 establishments in Hong Kong